TBD Records (previously Side One Recordings) was an American record label co-founded by Coran Capshaw and Phil Costello, and is a sublabel of ATO Records, distributed by RED Distribution. The label was founded in August 2007 and quickly announced its first release, the band Underworld's first studio album in five years, Oblivion with Bells.  Side One Recordings gained attention when it was connected with the CD release of Radiohead's 2007 album In Rainbows in the United States and Canada. In 2008 they signed the British band Hatcham Social, releasing their debut album You Dig The Tunnel I'll Hide The Soil in June 2009.

Name change from Side One Recordings
Due to legal issues with a similarly named operator in the U.S., Side One Recordings was forced to change its name. This brought Underworld and Radiohead under the same newly named label. According to the TBD Records website, "The original name for this record company was Side One Recordings. But some potential issues caused us to figure out a new name, and quick. We came up with TBD as it seemed appropriate for the situation, but we like it."

Artists signed to the label
 22-20s
 Hatcham Social
 Other Lives
 Port O'Brien
 Autolux
 Radiohead
 White Rabbits
 The Henry Clay People

Discography

Albums
Underworld - Oblivion with Bells (2007)
Radiohead - In Rainbows (2008), The King of Limbs (2011), TKOL RMX 1234567 (2011)
White Rabbits - It's Frightening (2009)
Other Lives - Other Lives (2009), Tamer Animals (2011)
Hatcham Social - You Dig The Tunnel I'll Hide The Soil (2009)
Port O'Brien - Threadbare (2009)
Autolux - Transit Transit (2010)
The Henry Clay People - Somewhere on the Gold Coast (2010)
White Rabbits - Milk Famous (2012)
The Henry Clay People - Twenty-Five For The Rest Of Our Lives (2012)

EPs
Other Lives - Other Lives (2008)
Hatcham Social - Postcard In Colours (2009)
White Rabbits - Percussion Gun Digital EP (2009)
Port O'Brien - Pan American Sessions (2010)

See also 
 List of record labels

References

External links
 Official website
 Underworld Oblivion with Bells press release
 Explanation of Radiohead's "In Rainbows" release on Side One (TBD) Recordings

American record labels
Record labels established in 2007
Indie rock record labels
Alternative rock record labels